Endynomena pradieri is a species of beetle in the family Carabidae, the only species in the genus Endynomena .

References

Lebiinae